Konstantinos "Kostas" Galanopoulos (Greek: Κωνσταντίνος "Κώστας" Γαλανόπουλος, born 28 December 1997) is a Greek professional footballer who plays as a midfielder for Super League club AEK Athens and the Greece national team.

Club career

AEK Athens
Galanopoulos started his career from Kentavros Vrilission at a young age. In 2011, he moved at AEK academy and on 21 August 2015 he signed a professional contract for three next years.
Despite having André Simões and Jacob Johansson in front of him in the AEK's roster, Galanopoulos managed to earn playing time this season with the club and showed great potential for his career ahead. On 31 May 2016, he made his professional debut, with AEK, against Panionios, for the Super League Play-offs. On 28 July 2016, he made his European debut in a 0–0 away game against Saint-Étienne for the first leg of the third qualifying round of UEFA Europa League. On 10 December 2016, he netted his first goal with the club in a 4–0 home win against Levadiakos. He was named MVP of the match.

In AEK's title winning 2017–18 season, Galanopoulos was often included in the starting line-up by Manolo Jiménez, forming a productive partnership with André Simões in the middle. Shielding the defence, the diminutive Greek (standing at 172 cm tall) provides an effective transition to the attacking third, able to protect possession and pass the ball forward accurately. On April 19, 2017, Galanopoulos agreed to a contract extension with AEK, until the summer of 2021. On 31 March 2019, he scored his first goal for the 2018–19 season as Christos Albanis found Galanopoulos and the AEK midfielder skipped past a Panetolikos defender before firing past Dimitris Kyriakidis in a 4–0 home win game against Panetolikos.
On 30 June 2019, according to multiple reports, Galanopoulos  agreed to a new deal, according to the original contract terms, which will see him remain at the club for the next two seasons. On 14 December 2019, Galanopoulos lashing in a winning goal in the 84th minute in a vital away 1–0 win against Xanthi. It was his first goal for the season.

On 18 December 2019, during the game against Asteras Tripolis, in-form midfielder was substituted with a nasty ankle injury, and subsequent medical tests have confirmed that the 21-year-old requires surgery. As a result of the seriousness of the injury, Galanopoulos will be unavailable to play for the next 1,5 months.

On 25 August 2020, Galanopoulos agreed to a contract extension with AEK, until the summer of 2023.

On 22 November 2020, he sealed a triumphant 4–1 home win against AEL. After the end of the match, Galanopoulos burst into tears, having previously been to the sidelines for 11 months. On 6 January 2021, he scored helping to a 1–0 home win against Panetolikos. On 24 January 2021, he scored in an eventual 2–2 away draw in the Double-headed eagles derby against PAOK.

On 18 April 2021, he scored in a 3–1 home win against Asteras Tripolis. On 29 April 2021, he scored the opener with a header after a corner kick by Muamer Tanković but the host team responded with two goals by Michael Krmenčík and Andrija Živković, and ΑΕΚ lost 2–1 to PAOK at Toumba Stadium in the 2nd leg of the semi final of 2020–21 Greek Cup and disqualified from the final of the competition.

On 8 October 2021, Galanopoulos suffered from an ankle injury, that which required immediate surgical treatment. The rehabilitation period was estimated at six months. It will be his third surgery, as in the 2019–20 season, Galanopoulos underwent surgery on the cartilage of his ankle. On 4 February 2021, he suffered a fracture in his right shoulder. In the first injury he was left out for 250 days, while another significant period of absence followed (59 days to be exact) for his shoulder.

International career
He has played for Greece U19 and Greece U21. On 15 May 2018, he made his debut with Greece in a 2–0 friendly game against Saudi Arabia.

Career statistics

Club

International

International goals
Scores and results list Greece's goal tally first.

Honours
AEK Athens
Superleague: 2017–18
Greek Cup: 2015–16, Runner-Up (4) 2016–17, 2017–18, 2018–19, 2019–20

References

External links

1997 births
Living people
Association football midfielders
Greece youth international footballers
Greece under-21 international footballers
Greece international footballers
AEK Athens F.C. players
Super League Greece players
Footballers from Athens
Greek footballers